is a Japanese manga series written and illustrated by Ken Wakui. It was serialized in Kodansha's Weekly Shōnen Magazine from March 2017 to November 2022, with its chapters collected in 31 tankōbon volumes. An anime television series adaptation produced by Liden Films, aired from April to September 2021. A second season premiered in January 2023. A live-action film adaptation was released in Japan in July 2021, with its sequel set to be released in 2023.

 the manga had over 70 million copies in circulation, making it one of the best-selling manga series of all time. In 2020, Tokyo Revengers won the 44th Kodansha Manga Award for the shōnen category.

Plot

First arc
Takemichi Hanagaki, a 26-year-old freeter, learns one day that his middle school ex-girlfriend, Hinata Tachibana, as well as her younger brother Naoto, have been killed by the Tokyo Manji Gang. When Takemichi is pushed in front of a train, he teleports exactly 12 years into the past to 2005. While reliving his middle school years, Takemichi meets with Naoto and divulges the exact date he and Hinata will die. When they shake hands, Takemichi is suddenly transported back to the present, creating a time paradox where Naoto survives and is now a detective. Naoto deduces that every time they hold hands, Takemichi is transported 12 years into the past. Using his knowledge from the future, Takemichi vows to save Hinata.

In the past, Takemichi's friends are forced into underground matches led by Kiyomasa, a member of the Tokyo Manji Gang. Takemichi's determination to protect them gains the respect of the gang's leader, Mikey. Takemichi discovers that his new friendship with Mikey prevented one of his friends, Akkun, from going to jail in the present. However, after Akkun commits suicide out of fear, Takemichi realizes the Tokyo Manji Gang presents a stronger threat to his friends than he initially thought.

After traveling back to the past, Takemichi finds that the Tokyo Manji Gang is declaring war on Moebius, a rival gang, to avenge Pah-chin's friend. Takemichi learns that Mikey's second-in-command, Draken, will eventually be killed and lead to Mikey becoming violent. Draken survives the rumble, but Pah-chin turns himself to the police after stabbing Moebius' leader, Osanai. This causes infighting within the Tokyo Manji Gang, as they disagree on how to help Pah-chin.

Takemichi resolves Mikey and Draken's dispute; however, on August 3, 2005, the Tokyo Manji Gang are attacked by a group of Moebius members, who are led by Valhalla member Shūji Hanma. Takemichi learns that Peh-yan colluded with them out of anger for Mikey and Draken letting Pah-chin be arrested, while Kiyomasa had stabbed Draken for humiliating him and causing him to be exiled from the Tokyo Manji Gang. The Tokyo Manji Gang wins the fight, Takemichi defeats Kiyomasa and Draken recovers from his injuries.

Valhalla / Bloody Halloween arc
Takemichi returns to the present, only to find out that Hinata and his friends still die in the current timeline. With only the clue that Tetta Kisaki transformed the Tokyo Manji Gang into a violent organization, Takemichi returns to the past to find that Kisaki has recently joined the gang, using Pah-chin's absence to become his division's new captain. Moreover, first division captain Keisuke Baji is leaving to join Valhalla, after being recruited by Kazutora Hanemiya, a former co-founder of the Tokyo Manji Gang. Mikey promises Takemichi that he will remove Kisaki from the gang if he is able to bring Baji back. With that, Takemichi is officially made a member of the Tokyo Manji Gang under Takashi Mitsuya's division.

Takemichi discovers that Mikey holds a grudge against Kazutora for killing his older brother, Shinichiro, two years ago. In addition, Takemichi learns through Chifuyu Matsuno that Baji pretended to defect from the gang to investigate Kisaki. Furthermore, he learns that Kisaki had created Valhalla for Mikey to be its leader, and the Tokyo Manji Gang will eventually be absorbed into Valhalla after a rumble on October 31, 2005 known as "Bloody Halloween"; their loss had been caused by Mikey killing Kazutora out of rage over killing Baji.

During Bloody Halloween, Baji attempts to stop Kisaki, but Kisaki and Hanma convince Kazutora to stab him as planned. Though the Tokyo Manji Gang wins, Takemichi is unable to prevent Baji's death. Moreover, Valhalla is absorbed into the group, and Kisaki uses their defeat to raise his status within the Tokyo Manji Gang. However, Takemichi is able to prevent Mikey from killing Kazutora, and Kazutora decides to turn himself into the police. Takemichi is then made the captain of the first division as Baji's successor.

Black Dragons / Christmas Showdown arc
After returning to the present, Takemichi once again discovers that the Tokyo Manji Gang has grown into a large-scale crime organization after absorbing the Black Dragons, and his friends still die. When he travels back to the past, he learns that Hakkai Shiba is forced to leave the Tokyo Manji Gang and join the Black Dragons under the orders of his abusive older brother and the Black Dragons' current leader, Taiju, an event that affects the Tokyo Manji Gang's merge with the Black Dragons. After Takemichi reveals to Chifuyu he is traveling through time, Mitsuya makes a deal with Taiju that he will allow Hakkai to join on the condition that Yuzuha, the Shiba brothers' sister, no longer works for the Black Dragons, nor will Taiju be allowed to assault her. Before bidding them farewell, Hakkai tells Takemichi and Chifuyu in secret that Taiju has no intention of keeping his promise and that he plans to kill him soon to free himself and Yuzuha.

Takemichi asks the Tokyo Manji Gang for help, but they decline to intervene, as breaking the agreement would reflect poorly on Mitsuya. However, he and Chifuyu reluctantly succeed in only getting the help of Kisaki and Hanma. Together, they learn from Koko and Inupi, two members of the Black Dragons, that Hakkai plans on murdering Taiju on December 24, 2005. On December 24, Takemichi confronts them, but he discovers that Kisaki and Hanma had betrayed and abandoned him. However, Chifuyu escapes and enlists Mitsuya for help in defeating Taiju.

After inadvertently preventing Taiju's death, Takemichi realizes that in the original timeline, Yuzuha had killed him after being coerced by Kisaki, which then led to Hakkai taking the blame for her and being forced to follow his orders. Takemichi convinces Hakkai to stand up to Taiju in order to save Yuzuha, and with Mikey and Draken's timely arrival, the Black Dragons are defeated. After their disbandment, Koko and Inupi carry the titles of co-leaders of the Black Dragons' 11th generation and join the Tokyo Manji Gang as Takemichi's subordinates. Having learned about Kisaki's betrayal, Mikey removes him from their group. Mikey's decision also causes Hanma and the former members of Moebius and Valhalla to leave, downsizing the Tokyo Manji Gang by 350 members.

Tenjiku arc
By the time Takemichi returns to the present, Tenjiku absorbed the Tokyo Manji Gang after an event known as the "Kanto incident" and left Mikey demoralized to the point of killing all his friends. While Takemichi and Naoto investigate Tenjiku, both of them learn that Kisaki is a member and that Shinichiro is the founder of the Black Dragons. When they are ambushed by Tenjiku members, they become fatally wounded, and Takemichi travels to the past before they both die. Hinata overhears Takemichi mourning Naoto's death, as well as the fact that he had been time-traveling.

Takemichi learns that Tenjiku's leader, Izana Kurokawa, is a close relative of the Sanos, and he holds a grudge against Mikey out of jealousy, especially when Shinichiro intended for Mikey to become the leader of the Black Dragons. In the midst of this, Mucho and his vice-captain, Sanzu, have joined Tenjiku, and Koko is forced to join them. Impressed by Takemichi's resolve, Inupi passes his title as the leader of the Black Dragons to Takemichi and reveals to the Tokyo Manji Gang that Izana is planning an attack on the Black Dragons' 11th anniversary, February 22, 2006. On the day of their fight, Takemichi loses the support from the other captains, as Kisaki and Hanma have severely injured Mitsuya and fourth division captain Smiley. In addition, Kisaki kills Mikey's half-sister, Emma, leaving Mikey and Draken distraught. Nevertheless, Takemichi rallies the rest of the Tokyo Manji Gang to fight Tenjiku, with only 50 members fighting against Tenjiku's 400 members.

Near the end of the fight, Mikey and Draken arrive after learning from Hinata that Takemichi had been time-traveling to save them. As the Tenjiku are forced to admit defeat, Kisaki shoots Kakucho, Tenjiku's second-in-command, and Izana, fatally wounding the latter and flees. When Takemichi confronts him, Kisaki confesses that his reason for taking over the Tokyo Manji Gang was to boost his social status and woo Hinata. He also views Takemichi as an enemy for stealing her attention and has Hinata killed in every present timeline for rejecting him. In the midst of this, Kisaki is hit by a truck and dies. After the Kanto incident, Hanma goes on the run, while Mikey decides to dissolve the Tokyo Manji Gang, allowing all of its members to move on.

Final arc
Takemichi returns to the present to find out that his friends are alive and successful, but Mikey, who has not been in contact with any of his friends for the past 12 years, has established a new gang called Bonten. Takemichi is no longer able to travel to the past through Naoto, but when he saves Mikey from jumping from a building, he suddenly travels 10 years into the past to 2008. Takemichi is now in high school and learns that since the Tokyo Manji Gang has been disbanded, there is currently a power struggle between Rokuhara Tandai, Brahman, and Mikey's new gang, the Kanto Manji Gang. In hopes of reaching Mikey, Takemichi joins Brahman, led by Senju Kawaragi, and suddenly develops the ability to see into the future. On July 7, 2008, Rokuhara Tandai launches an attack on Takemichi and Senju. Takemichi prevents Senju's death, but Draken is killed while protecting them. As a result, a brawl, known as the Battle of the Three Deities, erupts between all three gangs and ends with Mikey killing South, Rokuhara Tandai's leader. The Kanto Manji Gang wins and absorbs Rokuhara Tandai; meanwhile, Senju disbands Brahman in order to stop Mikey from killing Takemichi.

One month later, Takemichi recreates the Tokyo Manji Gang and challenges the Kanto Manji Gang to a fight on September 9. During the fight, Sanzu attempts to drive a train into the battlefield to kill the Tokyo Manji Gang. Though Takemichi is able to prevent this, Kakucho dies in the process. Taiju returns and stops Sanzu, but Mikey defeats everyone on the battlefield. When Takemichi confronts Mikey, Mikey reveals that he died in the original timeline and Shinichiro had traveled back in time to save him by stealing the ability from a homeless man who he murdered. However, as a result, a curse manifested in the form of violent behavior that lead to Shinichiro's death and Takemichi inheriting his ability. In the present, Takemichi allows Mikey to succumb to his violent nature to fight him. Mikey mortally wounds Takemichi, but upon holding his hand, both of them return to 1998 with their memories in tact. Both Mikey and Takemichi work together to avert the previous timelines' tragedies and unite all gangs across Japan for eleven years, thus successfully creates a peaceful timeline.

Characters

Tokyo Manji Gang

Takemichi the main protagonist of the series. Takemichi was 26-year old freeter living his life in a daze while watching the news he learn that his former girlfriend Hinata Tachibana and her brother Naoto were killed in a conflict caused by the Tokyo Manji Gang which left him severely depressed by the news. Later while taking the Train he was pushed off onto the train tracks where he end up time leaping twelve years into the past back when he was still in middle school. During the time Takemichi ends up meeting Hinata's brother Naoto where he tells him about how he ended up being pushed off onto the train and that Naoto and Hinata will die twelve years in the future and shake hands with Naoto where he ends up traveling back to the present where he was saved by Naoto now alive in the present now a police officer. Naoto then explained to Takemichi about his time-leaping abilities and convinced him to time leap to the past to save Hinata he agree and began a personal mission to save Hinata from dying.  
 / 

The leader of Tokyo Manji Gang known as Toman, nicknamed Mikey. A gang known for it honorable ideals beliefs aiming to reach goal in establishing a new golden era for delinquents in the Kanto region. However, this image crumbled as its ranks were continually corrupted and transformed into a criminal organization that took the lives of innocent civilians in the present day. During the time, he met Takemichi and befriended him after witnessing him resolved fighting against Kiyomasa and after the conflicted against Mobious he invited him to join the Gang for saving Draken when he was stabbed during the conflict. During the conflict against Tenjiku Mikey learn about Takemichi's time leaping and after that he decide to disband Toman to ensure a better future for everyone and choose to distant himself from his friend because of dark impulse inside him that he couldn't control and founded the Kanto Manji Gang two years after the conflict and during the present timeline He is the leader of Criminal Organization known Bonten which what Toman was before in the Present Timeline.
 / 

The vice-captain of the Tokyo Manji Gang. He is Mikey's best friend and is known his mature and big brother attitude and also befriended Takemichi when witnessing his resolved fighting Kiyomasa. During the conflict against Moebious he was stab by Kiyomasa and died in first timeline but Takemichi saved him and survived. In the second present timeline he was in death row for committing various murders under the orders Kisaki. Later during Tenjiku where Emma Mikey's younger sister was killed by Kisaki which leave Mikey and Draken devastated later Draken learned about Takemichi's time leaping and believe it after seeing Takemichi's frantic behavior many times.

Is one of Top Admin of the Tokyo Manji Gang in the present timeline and responsible for the order the murder of Hinata Tachibana in multiple timelines. He plot various thing behind in order to take control of the Tokyo Manji Gang such to instigate Kiyomasa stabbing Draken in order to take over as the vice captain of the Tokyo Manji Gang but this was thwarted by Takemichi when he save Draken from dying. So instead end becoming the Captain of the Third Division of the gang succeeding Pah-chin who turn himself in to the police. However after the conflict against the 10th Generation Black Dragon he was kick out from Toman by Mikey. As a result Kisaki turns to Izana Kurokawa and joined Tenjiku and then personally killed Mikey's sister Emma in order to break Mikey's emotions and make Izana in becoming Mikey's emotional support. However, Tenjiku lost against Toman when he end up killing Izana and attempted to flee. During his confrontation with Takemichi, he reveals his romantic obsession with Hina and aims to become the Top Delinquent to earn her love and propose to her but she rejected him due her feeling for Takemichi which was the reason why he orders Hinata's murder unable to accept Hinata's rejection. Takemichi enraged by Kisaki's motive took his gun intending to kill him so Hina would be alive in the present. However, as Kisaki attempted to escape he end up getting hit by a truck and died as result.

The Captain of the First Division of the Tokyo Manji Gang and one of the founding members of the Tokyo Manji Gang. He is a very devoted and loyal member of the gang in maintaining the gang ideals. During the time he and Kazutora planned to break in and steal motorbike from a motorbike shop as a present for Mikey's birthday. However, unknown to him and Kazutora, the shop belonged to Mikey's older brother Shinichiro. After Shinichiro caught the two trying to steal the bike, Kazutora accidentally killed him before Baji could explain who he was. During the conflict between Toman and Vallaha, Baji seemingly switched sides to Vallaha. In reality, Baji joined in order to learn more about Kisaki. At the fight between the two gangs, Kazutora stabs Baji for betraying Vallaha. Before dying, Baji choose to kill himself, so Kazutora wouldn't be held responsible for his death. Mikey, enraged over Baji's death, nearly kills Kazutora before Takemichi intervenes while invoking Baji's wish in forgiven Kazutora.

The Captain of the Second Division of the Tokyo Manji Gang.

The Vice Captain of the Second Division of the Tokyo Manji Gang. He is the younger brother of Taiju and Yuzuha. In an alternative present timeline he was an Admin of Toman and the 11th Generation Leader of the Black Dragon for apparently killing Taiju. During the Christmas Conflict it was reveal Hakkai planned to kill Taiju but failed and it was Yuzuha who killed Taiju stabbing due to the abuse Yuzuha and Hakkai went through while Taiju tried his best look after them  but ended up physically abusing them but Takemichi prevented this and Taiju managed to survive. When Hakkai tried to muster his resolve to kill Taiju but Takemichi stopped him and convinced him to stand up for himself in order to protect Yuzuha and face Taiju. After holding his ground soon Mikey and Draken arrived and Mikey defeated Taiju with one blow and Draken defeated all members of the Black Dragons.

The Captain of the Third Division of the Tokyo Manji Gang. During the conflict against Moebius Pah-chin stab the leader of Moebius before staying behind to turn himself in. His arrest cause internal conflict within Toman.

The Vice Captain of the Third Division of the Tokyo Manji Gang.

Is the Captain of the Fifth Division.

The Vice Captain of the First Division of the Tokyo Manji Gang. Chifuyu help Baji in joining Vallaha by let himself get beaten up by him so Baji can prove his loyalty. In the Aftermath of Baji's death He nominated Takemichi to suceading Baji as the captain of 1st Division. Later Takemichi later reveal to Chifuyu about his time leap powers and agreed in help Takemichi to changed the past.

Was one of the Founding members of the Tokyo Manji Gang. However he was sent to juvie after he end up killing Mikey's older brother Shinichiro when he and Baji attempt to steel Moterbike as a Present for Mikey's Birthday.

Is the Leader of 10th Generations of the Black Dragons. He is the older brother of Yuzuha and Hakkai. When their mother died Taiju took upon himself to care for his siblings however the stress cause him physically and emotionally abuse them.

Other members

Was one of Takemichi's friends back in middle school.

Moebius

Other characters

Takemichi's girlfriend back in middle school she was killed in a conflict involved the present Tokyo Manji Gang which motivated Takemichi travel back to past to save her from dying.

Hinata's younger brother who also died in the conflict cause by the Tokyo Manji Gang in the present timeline. When Takemichi travel back to the past he end up meeting Naoto where Takemichi told him how he and Hina were going to died in the future and he end up traveling to the past. When Takemichi and Naoto shake hand Takemichi return to the present with Naoto alive now a Police Officer and convince Takemichi to go back to the past to save Hina. Since then Naoto has serve as Takemichi trigger to for his time leaping, up until Kisaki's death in 18th timeline. As both Mikey and Takemichi traveled back in 1998 and avert the previous timelines' tragedies for eleven years, Naoto got a dream job as a journalist for occult magazine in the last 20th timeline.

Is Mikey's younger half sister. Before the conflict against Tenjiku she was murdered by Kisaki in order break Mikey and have Izana become the only emotional support for Mikey. Following the 20th time leap, where both Takemichi and Mikey successfully saved Emma and the rest of casualties who died in previous timelines, Emma is now Drakken's house wife, sometimes before Takemichi and Hina's marriage.

Mikey's late older brother and the leader of the first-generation Black Dragon. He was later revealed to be one of the two previous Time Leapers before Takemichi, hailed from a previous timeline where Mikey passed away in 2003, four years after a childhood accident, with their family friend, Sanzu became his trigger to return to the past and avert Mikey's accident.
Following his successful time travel, despite having discovered what caused Mikey's violent intent uncontrollable, Shinichiro returned in the new 2003 timeline and finally serves his purpose. At the same time, he rescued a young Takemichi, as well as young Hina from three middle school bullies and decided to transfer his Time Leaping power to him, as the means to inspire him to continue hero's path. Although he was unaware that Kisaki was present learning Shinichiro's existence. Shortly after visiting the location where he killed the previous Time Leaper in the previous timeline, Shinichiro suffered a similar karmic death of being inadvertly killed by Kazutora when the latter and Baji attempt to steal a motorbike as a birthday present for Mikey.
Once Mikey and Takemichi are able to return to the past further at the same time, with the former is freed from his violent intent, Shinichiro's death has been averted, allowing Kazutora and Baji to be enlisted to accompany him for Mikey's surprise birthday in a peaceful 2003 timeline. For eleven years since Mikey and Takemichi successfully averted the previous timeline's tragedies, Shinichiro becomes the head of S.S.Motors, which mainly co-sponsors Mikey's motorcycle racing team.

Taiju and Hakkai's sister who is a good fighter and protects Hakkai from Taiju's abuse. Following Taiju's redemption in current timelines, Yuzuha becomes Hakkai's manager during their oversea business models in the last 20th timeline.

Media

Manga
Written and illustrated by Ken Wakui, Tokyo Revengers was serialized in Kodansha's shōnen manga magazine Weekly Shōnen Magazine from March 1, 2017, to November 16, 2022. Kodansha collected its 278 individual chapters in thirty-one tankōbon volumes, released from May 17, 2017, to January 17, 2023.

In North America, Kodansha USA started the digital release of the manga in 2018. Seven Seas Entertainment started releasing the manga in a print omnibus edition in 2022.

The manga is also licensed in Taiwan by Tong Li Publishing, in South Korea by Haksan Publishing, in France by Glénat Editions, in Germany by Carlsen Manga, in Italy by J-Pop, in Spain by Norma Editorial, in Mexico by Panini Comics, in Brazil by Editora JBC, in Argentina by Editorial Ivrea, in Thailand by Vibulkij Publishing, in Indonesia by Elex Media Komputindo, in Vietnam by IPM, in Poland by Waneko, in Turkey by Gerekli Şeyler in Russia by XL Media, in Ukraine by Nasha Idea, and in the Czech Republic by Crew.

On October 28, 2021, a parody spin-off manga written and illustrated by Shinpei Funatsu titled Tōdai Revengers was announced. It began serialization in Kodansha's Magazine Pocket website on November 3, 2021. It has been collected in five tankōbon volumes as of January 17, 2023. The series will end with the release of its sixth volume.

On June 20, 2022, a spin-off manga centered around Keisuke Baji and Chifuyu Matsuno written and illustrated by Yukinori Kawaguchi, titled Tokyo Revengers: Baji Keisuke Kara no Tegami was announced. It began serialization in Magazine Pocket on July 27, 2022. It has been collected in two tankōbon volumes as of January 17, 2023.

Volume list

Tōdai Revengers

Tokyo Revengers: Baji Keisuke Kara no Tegami

Anime

In June 2020, it was announced that Tokyo Revengers would receive an anime television series adaptation. The series is produced by Liden Films and directed by Koichi Hatsumi. The series features scripts by Yasuyuki Mutō, character designs by Keiko Ōta, sound direction by Satoki Iida and music composed by Hiroaki Tsutsumi. It aired on MBS and other networks from April 11 to September 19, 2021. Official Hige Dandism performed the opening theme song, "Cry Baby", while Eill performed the series' ending theme song . The second ending song is "Tokyo Wonder", performed by Nakimushi. Crunchyroll licensed the series outside of Asia. Muse Communication has licensed the series in Southeast Asia and South Asia and streams it on their Muse Asia YouTube channel and Bilibili. They also licensed the anime to Animax Asia for TV broadcasts.

A series of anime shorts produced by Studio Puyukai featuring chibi versions of the characters, titled , was released on YouTube from April 12 to September 20, 2021.

On December 18, 2021, Tokyo Revengers was renewed for a second season, which adapts the "Christmas Showdown" arc. It premiered on January 8, 2023. Official Hige Dandism performed the opening theme song , while Tuyu performed the ending theme song . Disney Platform Distribution licensed the season.

Live-action film
A live-action film adaptation was announced in February 2020. The film is directed by Tsutomu Hanabusa, with a screenplay by Izumi Takahashi, and music by Yutaka Yamada. The cast includes Takumi Kitamura, Yūki Yamada, Yosuke Sugino, Nobuyuki Suzuki, Hayato Isomura, Shotaro Mamiya, Ryo Yoshizawa, and Mio Imada. In April 2020, it was announced that the film's crew has halted filming due to the COVID-19 pandemic. The film was originally set to open in Japan on October 9, 2020, but in June 2020, the film has been delayed due to the continuing effects of COVID-19. In March 2021, it was announced that the film has been rescheduled to premiere on July 9, 2021. Crunchyroll streamed the film outside of Japan.

A sequel titled , was announced in July 2022. The films are set to premiere on April 21 and June 30, 2023, respectively. New cast members include Kento Nagayama, Nijiro Murakami, and Mahiro Takasugi.

Stage plays
A stage play adaptation produced by Office Endless ran from August 6–22, 2021, with shows taking place in Tokyo, Osaka, and Kanagawa. The play is directed by Naohiro Ise. The theme song of the stage play is "Hero" by Sir Vanity, a pop rock band headlined by voice actors Yūichirō Umehara and Yoshiki Nakajima.

A second stage play, titled Tokyo Revengers: Bloody Halloween, ran from March 18–21 in Osaka and March 25–April 5, 2022 in Tokyo. The theme song is "Will" by Sir Vanity.

Reception

Popularity
In 2021, Tokyo Revengers won in the anime category of the Yahoo! Japan Search Awards, based on the number of searches for a particular term compared to the year before. The series topped the list of "Trend Rankings Selected by Teens in 2021" by Mynavi Corporation's Mynavi Teens Lab, which conducts teen marketing and research. The anime series was highlighted by Nikkei Entertainment as one of the 2021's biggest hits, ranked in as the top-watched streaming program for both male and female audiences. The series won the "Anime Award" for its popularity on the 2021 Twitter Japan's Trend Awards. The anime adaptation of Tokyo Revengers became the 7th most discussed TV show of 2021 worldwide on Twitter.

Manga
Tokyo Revengers won the 44th Kodansha Manga Award in the shōnen category in 2020. The series ranked 9th on the 2021 "Book of the Year" list by Da Vinci magazine; it ranked 18th on the 2022 list. It ranked 12th on Takarajimasha's Kono Manga ga Sugoi! 2022 list of best manga for male readers.

Sales
As of February 2020, the manga had over 3 million copies in circulation. As of May 2021, the manga had 17 million copies in circulation. As of June 2021, the manga had over 20 million copies in circulation. By the start of July 2021, the manga had over 25 million copies in circulation. As of August 2021, the manga had over 35 million copies in circulation. As of September 2021, the manga had over 40 million copies in circulation. As of January 2022, the manga had over 50 million copies in circulation. As of July 2022, the manga had over 65 million copies in circulation including 7 million copies outside of Japan. As of December 2022, the manga had over 70 million copies in circulation.

Tokyo Revengers was the third best-selling manga series in the first half of 2021 with over 5 million copies sold. It was the third best-selling manga in 2021, with over 24.9 million copies sold. It was the second best-selling manga series in 2022, with over 11 million copies sold; volumes 25–29 were among the 25 best-selling manga volumes of the year.

Anime
In 2021, Western localized versions of the anime censored the Buddhist manji swastika (卍) symbol used by the Tokyo Manji Gang, in order to avoid potential controversy that may arise from confusion with the similar-looking Nazi swastika (卐) symbol. The removal, carried out by the Japanese licensors and affecting all versions of the anime officially distributed outside Japan, has itself proven controversial, as some fans have criticized the resulting version both on technical and freedom-of-speech grounds. However, the official Southeast Asian and South Asian releases of the series by Muse Communication started releasing the uncensored versions later on, leaving Crunchyroll the only official streaming site outside of Japan to have the anime censored.

Notes

References

External links
  
  
  
  
 

2021 anime television series debuts
2021 anime ONAs
Action anime and manga
Anime and manga about time travel
Anime series based on manga
Censored television series
Crunchyroll anime
Hulu original programming
Japanese action films
Japanese science fiction films
Japanese time travel television series
Japanese webcomics
Kodansha manga
Liden Films
Live-action films based on manga
Mainichi Broadcasting System original programming
Manga adapted into films
Muse Communication
School life in anime and manga
Science fiction anime and manga
Seven Seas Entertainment titles
Shōnen manga
Studio Puyukai
Thriller anime and manga
Time loop anime and manga
Winner of Kodansha Manga Award (Shōnen)
Yankī anime and manga